Humming Bird Records (often referred to as Hummingbird Records) was a mid-20th century record label based in Waco, Texas.

The label focused on local and regional artists of various genres including Cajun music (e.g. Harry Choates) and Texas Czech polka/waltz music (e.g. Frank Kubin, Rhine Winkler, etc.).

Humming Bird initially issued releases on 78rpm before transitioning to 45rpm.

See also
List of record labels

External links
 Humming Bird Records on the Internet Archive's Great 78 Project

Defunct record labels of the United States